The Golden Slipper is a Grade II listed pub in the city centre of York, England.

The pub lies on Goodramgate.  It was originally constructed about 1500 as a house, with the north-eastern half the building dating from this period.  This section is three storeys high and timber-framed.  Its facade is jettied to the street, and rendered over.  To its right, it originally overhung an alleyway, but the neighbouring Royal Oak has since extended into this space.  In the 18th-century, it was extended to the rear, in brick, with an attic added to this section in the 19th-century.

The south-western half of the building dates from the 19th-century.  It is brick-built and of two storeys, with a basement and attic.  Internally, the building has been frequently altered and does not retain any original features.  Its ground floor, based around a corridor, is largely Victorian, but was partly redesigned in 1983, against the objections of the Campaign for Real Ale.

The older half of the building may have already been a pub in the 18th-century, named the Show, the name taken either from a greyhound, or as an alternative spelling of "shoe".  By 1812, it was The Slipper, becoming The Golden Slipper in the 20th-century.

There are stories of the pub being haunted, with ghosts said to manifest themselves when the building is being decorated.  The haunting was linked to the discovery of a Mediaeval children's shoe in 1984, during work at the pub.  The building was later exorcised.

References

Buildings and structures completed in the 1400s
Goodramgate
Grade II listed pubs in York